Doyle Settlement was a ranch and settlement in Pueblo, Pueblo County, Colorado. It was listed on the National Register of Historic Places on April 4, 1980.

Joseph Doyle
Joseph Doyle purchased 1,200 acres of land along two miles of the Huerfano River in 1859 and established the Doyle Settlement. The land was from the Vigil and St. Vrain Land Grant. Born in 1817 in what is now West Virginia, Doyle came west as a young man and was a trapper and trader. He was one of the builders of El Pueblo in the current city of Pueblo, Colorado and then was a farmer, businessman, and territorial lawyer. He was the first county commissioner for Huerfano County. He operated a post office from him home Casa Blanca, having been appointed postmaster. In 1864, he represented Pueblo, Fremont, El Paso, and Huerfano Counties in the State Council of the Territorial legislature. Doyle died in 1864 and left the property to his wife, Maria De La Cruz Suaso, whom he married in 1844. Her mother Teresita Sandoval managed the property. It remained in the family for decades.

Settlement
The Doyle Settlement is "the site of one of the earliest, non-mining communities established in Colorado." Structures began to be built on the site in the late 1850s and are thought to have been built through the early 1860s. The only standing building is the schoolhouse. There is some evidence of the previous buildings, such as a few remaining foundations and ruins.

Fort
An adobe fort was built by the Huerfano River. At the time of its construction, it was the only residence for many miles. There were probably no more than a couple of dozen people living at the settlement.

Residential buildings
Doyle's house, Casa Blanca or White House, was built about 1862 and is considered the most important of the settlement's structures. It is a large white frame house, like the kind of house he would have seen from his home state.

There were also two rows of houses with jackal or adobe architecture. Running on a north-south axis, the houses faced each other. The western row were used as granaries and storehouses. The eastern group was used for living and cooking.

Cemetery
Northwest of Casa Blanca is a cemetery with "some of the finest carved headstones in Colorado" according to the Pueblo Regional Planning Commission for the Preservation Advisory Committee. The headstones represent the mixed heritage of the settlement's residents. Women were primarily of Spanish-Mexican heritage and men were primarily American.

School

The school, which still stands, is believed to be the oldest school and the oldest one-room school in Colorado. It was built of adobe, wood siding, and wooden shingles. Doyle brought O.G. Goldrick to teach his children. He was the state's first school teacher. A sign by the schoolhouse provides information about its history.

Business
On the property was an adobe store, blacksmith shop, and a gristmill. Doyle had installed irrigation ditches and farmed 600 acres of the land.

References

External links
 Oldest known standing school in Colorado Smithsonian photo content winner

National Register of Historic Places in Pueblo County, Colorado
Buildings and structures in Pueblo County, Colorado